Outram Island is an island of the Andaman Islands.  It belongs to the South Andaman administrative district, part of the Indian union territory of Andaman and Nicobar Islands.

Etymology
Outram is named after Lieutenant-general James Outram.

Geography
The island belongs to the Ritchie's Archipelago and is located west of North Passage Island, Rangat.

Administration
Politically, Outram Island is part of Port Blair Taluk.

Demographics 
The island is uninhabited.

References 

Ritchie's Archipelago
Islands of South Andaman district
Islands of the Andaman Sea
Uninhabited islands of India
Islands of India
Islands of the Bay of Bengal